Sarah Khan (born 14 July 1992) also known as Sarah Falak is a Pakistani actress who
appears in Urdu-language television series. She made her acting debut with a supporting role in 2012 Hum TV's serial Badi Aapa and followed by other brief roles in several series. Khan is best known for her portrayal as Miraal in Hum TV's drama Sabaat. 

She rose to prominence with the role of Farisa in the Moomal-produced romantic Alvida (2015) and later on appeared as Saba in the mystery drama Mohabbat Aag Si (2015), which earned her a Hum Award for Best Supporting Actress. She subsequently garnered wide recognition for portraying leading roles in the romantic drama Tumhare Hain, the black magic-based Nazr-e-Bad (both 2017), Belapur Ki Dayan (2018), which earned her a Best Actress nomination at Hum Awards. Further praise came for her performance in the mystery drama Band Khirkiyan (2018), Raqs e Bismil (2020) and Laapata (2021).

Early life and career
Khan was born in Medina, Saudi Arabia to a Lebanese mother and a Pakistani father. She has 2 sisters Noor Zafar Khan who is also an actress and Aisha Khan.

Khan made her acting debut as a supporting role in 2012, Badi Aapa aired on Hum TV, where she played the role of the daughter of the main characters. Next, she appeared in a telenovela serial Mirat-ul-Uroos which was broadcast on Geo TV in the same year. She played the featuring role of Humna alongside Mehwish Hayat, Mikaal Zulfiqar, Ahsan Khan, Samina Ahmad, and Ayesha Khan.

Khan followed it with supporting roles in much successful television series. Her breakthrough came with a negative character of a selfish opportunist in 2015 in the romantic drama Alvida with Sanam Jung, and Imran Abbas Naqvi. The drama was aired on Hum TV and she also got nomination for this act. In the same year, she gave a wonderful performance in the drama Mohabbat Aag Si and got an award for best actor in a supporting role. She played the role of a brave housewife, Saba as a supporting actress along with Azfar Rehman. In 2014, she appeared in a soap series Bhool with Sanam Chaudhry, Behroze Sabzwari, and Fazila Qazi. She was recognized as one of the BBC's 100 women of 2014.

The drama was based on some political intrigue and received several awards, including a Hum Award for Best Actress Popular for her. In 2018 she did a role in Belapur Ki Dayan, where she was the Dayan in the drama along with Adnan Siddiqui and Ammar Khan. Khan received appreciation and gained critical acclaim for portraying Zohra in Raqs e Bismil.

Personal life 
Khan married Pakistani singer and songwriter Falak Shabir in July 2020.  On 8 October 2021, Shabir announced the birth of their daughter.

Filmography

Special appearance

Awards and nominations

References

External links
 

People from Medina
Actresses from Karachi
Pakistani television actresses
Pashtun women
21st-century Pakistani actresses
Living people
1992 births
Pakistani people of Lebanese descent
BBC 100 Women